Django is a fictional character who appears in a number of Spaghetti Western films. Originally played by Franco Nero in the Italian film of the same name by Sergio Corbucci, he has appeared in 31 films since then. Especially outside of the genre's home country Italy, mainly Germany, countless releases have been retitled in the wake of the original film's enormous success.

Character biography

Franco Nero films

Django
Django is a 1966 Spaghetti Western directed by Sergio Corbucci starring Franco Nero as Django; a dismissed Union soldier who fought in the American Civil War. The film is set in 1869, four years after the end of the Civil War. After arriving in a bleak, mud-drenched town in the American Southwest and dragging a coffin behind him, Django gets caught up in a violent race war between a gang of Mexican bandits, led by General Hugo, and a clan of militants under the command of the sadistic Major Jackson. Armed with a deadly Mitrailleuse volley gun, Django proceeds to play both sides against each other in the pursuit of money and, ultimately, revenge against Jackson; the Major having murdered his wife years before.

Django Strikes Again
Twenty years after the events in the first Django, the title character has left the violent life of a gunslinger to become a monk. Living in seclusion in a monastery, he wants no more of the violent actions he perpetrated. Suddenly, he learns from a dying former lover that some time ago he had a young daughter, who has been kidnapped along with other children who are now working for a ruthless Belgian criminal known as El Diablo (The Devil) Orlowsky, who is an arms dealer and slave trader. The children and other prisoners work in Orlowsky's mine, from which he hopes to get rich from the spoils. Determined to find his daughter and nail the bad guys, Django gets some arms and goes on the warpath against Orlowsky's private army.

Appearances

Official films

Franco Nero films

 Django (1966) – The original film that introduced the character, directed by Sergio Corbucci and starring Franco Nero as the eponymous character.
 Django Strikes Again (1987) – The first official sequel to Django, starring Franco Nero as the eponymous character.

Unofficial films
The enormous success of the original Django movie in 1966 inspired unofficial sequels to be created by a multitude of studios, due to loose copyright laws in Italy at the time. Some actually feature the character of Django, and some titles just capitalize on the name, even though the character is not in the film.
 A Few Dollars for Django (1966) starring Anthony Steffen
 Django Shoots First (1966) starring Glenn Saxson
 Two Thousand Dollars for Coyote a.k.a. Django, A Bullet for You (1966) starring James Philbrook. Original title:  "Django cacciatore di taglie".
 Two Sons of Ringo (1966) starring Franco Franchi
 Django Does Not Forgive (1966)
 Massacre Time a.k.a. Django the Runner (1966) starring Franco Franchi
 God Forgives... I Don't! (1967)
 Django, The Last Killer (1967) starring George Eastman
 Django Kill... If You Live, Shoot! (1967) starring Tomas Milian
 Don't Wait, Django… Shoot! (1967) starring Ivan Rassimov (as Sean Todd)
 Son of Django a.k.a. Return of Django (1967)
 10,000 Dollars for a Massacre (1967) starring Gianni Garko
 Any Gun Can Play (1967)
 Two Faces of the Dollar (1967)
 Man, Pride and Vengeance (1967) starring Franco Nero. Original title:  "L'uomo, l'orgoglio, la vendetta".
 Django Kills Softly (1967). Original title:  "Bill il taciturno".
 Vengeance is Mine (1967) a.k.a. 100,000 Dollars for a Killing. Original title:  "Per 100.000 dollari ti ammazzo".
 Rita of the West (1967). The character is parodied by Lucio Rosato.
 Django, Prepare a Coffin (1968) starring Terence Hill - This movie is unique among the plethora of films which capitalized on Corbucci's in that it is not only a semi-official, legitimate sequel, but was also originally intended to star Nero.
 If You Want to Live... Shoot! (1968)
 No Room To Die a.k.a. Hanging for Django a.k.a. A Noose for Django (1969) starring Anthony Steffen. Original title:  "Una lunga fila di croci".
 False Django (1969)
 Django the Bastard (1969) starring Anthony Steffen
 One Damned Day at Dawn...  Django Meets Sartana! (1970) starring Jack Betts
 Django Defies Sartana a.k.a. Django Against Sartana (1970)
 Django and Sartana Are Coming... It's the End (1970) starring Jack Betts
 Django Is Always No. 2 (1971)
 W Django! a.k.a. Viva! Django a.k.a. A Man Called Django (1971)
 Django's Cut Price Corpses a.k.a. A Pistol for Django (1971)
 Ballad of Django (1971)
 Gunman of One Hundred Crosses (1971)
 Shoot, Django! Shoot First! (1971)
 Kill Django... Kill First (1971)
 Down with Your Hands... You Scum! (1971)
 Django... Adios! a.k.a.  Death Is Sweet from the Soldier of God (1972) starring Brad Harris. Original title: Seminò la morte... lo chiamavano Castigo di Dio. 
 Long Live Django! (1972)
 Sukiyaki Western Django (2007)
 Django Unchained (2012). A Quentin Tarantino film starring Jamie Foxx and featuring the original actor of Django, Franco Nero, as a minor character. Tarantino's re-envisioned Django character is a former slave turned bounty hunter on a quest to liberate his wife.

TV series 
Django is portrayed by Matthias Schoenaerts in the 2023 TV series of the same name.

See also 

 Man with No Name, a milestone Spaghetti Western character
 Sartana, another Spaghetti Western character
 The Sabata Trilogy

Further reading 
 Peter E. Bondanella Italian cinema: from neorealism to the present. Published by: Continuum International Publishing Group, 2001 – 546 p. ,  (P.254,267)
 David Carter "The Western". Published by: Kamera Books, 2008 – 192 p. ,  (P.190)
 Peter Cowie, Derek Elley "World Filmography: 1967". Published by: Fairleigh Dickinson Univ Press, 1977 – 688 p. ,  (P.303,306,310,331)
 Christopher Frayling "Spaghetti westerns: cowboys and Europeans from Karl May to Sergio Leone". Published by: I.B. Tauris; 2006 – 304 p. ,  (P.4,11,14,17,19,26,51,52,62,79–89,92,94,95,136,157,169,232,256,257,261,263,264,267,281,282,284,293,301,303,304)
 Bert Fridlund "The spaghetti Western: a thematic analysis". Published by: McFarland & Co., 2006 – 296 p. ,  (P.93,98)
 Phil Hardy "The Western, vol.1". Published by: W. Morrow, 1983 – 395 p. ,  (P.295,300,302)
 Harris M. Lentz "Western and frontier film television credits: 1903–1995". Published by: McFarland, 1996 – 1517 p. ,  (P.741)
 David Lusted "The western". Published by: Pearson Education, 2003 – 324 p. ,  (P.188,307)
 Jasper P. Morgan "Spaghetti Heroes: Ringo, Django und Sartana. Die Helden Des Italo-Western/Heroes of The Spaghetti Western". Published by: Mpw Medien Publikations, 2008 – 256 p. , 
 Jürgen Müller "Movies of the 60s". Published by: Taschen, 2004 – 640 p. , 
 Luca M. Palmerini, Gaetano Mistretta "Spaghetti nightmares: il cinema italiano della paura e del fantastico visto attraverso gli occhi dei suoi protagonisti". Roma: Palmerini & Mistretta, 1996 – 338 p. ,   (P.108,113,140)
 Stephen Prince "Sam Peckinpah's The wild bunch". Published by: Cambridge University Press, 1999 – 228 p. ,  (P.137,152)
 Georg Seesslen, Claudius Weil "Western-Kino: Geschichte und Mythologie des Western-Films". Reinbek bei Hamburg : Rowohlt, 1979 – 252 p. ,  (166,184,189,219)
 USSR Union of Writers Detskaya Literatura Moscow: Khudozhestvennaya Literatura, 1989
 Thomas Weisser "Spaghetti westerns: the good, the bad, and the violent : a comprehensive". Published by: McFarland, 1992 – 502 p. ,  (P.10,91,129)
 Various. The Spaghetti Western, An Introduction (article in many languages). The Spaghetti Western Database. link

References

External links

Fictional Union Army personnel
Fictional American Civil War veterans
Fictional Christian monks
Fictional hoboes
Fictional mass murderers
Fictional mercenaries
Fictional vigilantes
Film characters introduced in 1966
Western (genre) gunfighters
Western (genre) heroes and heroines